National religion may refer to:
 State religion
 National church

See also 
 Civil religion